These are the complete Grand Prix racing results for Jordan Grand Prix.

Complete Formula One results
(key)

Complete International Formula 3000 results
(key) (Races in bold indicate pole position; races in italics indicate fastest lap)

References

Formula One constructor results